Erik Blomberg (18 September 1913 – 12 October 1996) was a Finnish cinematographer, film producer, screenwriter and film director. He was married to actress Mirjami Kuosmanen.

Selected filmography
 The Stolen Death (1938)
 One Man's Faith (1940)
 The Österman Brothers' Virago (1945)
 The Wedding on Solö (1946)
 Life in the Finnish Woods (1947)
 The White Reindeer (1953)

References

External links

1913 births
1996 deaths
Artists from Helsinki
People from Uusimaa Province (Grand Duchy of Finland)
Swedish-speaking Finns
Finnish cinematographers
Finnish film producers
Finnish screenwriters
Finnish film directors
Writers from Helsinki
20th-century screenwriters